is a Japanese actress and singer. Until 1970, she used the stage name . She is represented with Kagawa Office. She graduated from Musashino-shi Daiichi Elementary School, Musashino Municipal First Junior High School, and Nakano Fumizono High School (now Otsuma Nakano High School).

Biography
At the age of 14, she was chosen as the chorus group (Young Fresh) and was singing such as "Masked Ninja Red Shadow" and "Hyoutakomi Haru Island". In 1968, she appeared as a voice actress in the feature animation film Andersen Monogatari.

In 1970, all four works were produced in the latter part of Nikkatsu (the fourth work was made in 1971) and made a debut in three titles Harenchi Gakuen (also at Yuri Harenchi Gakuen aired on the same year she acted as Mitsuko Yagyuu and she made a spotlight as a "Sexy Talent").

In 2017, she was cast in Ariyoshi's Meeting for Reviewing, and changed her stage name to "Pai Pai Miyuki".

Filmography

TV series

Variety

Others

Discography

Single codes

See also
List of Japanese actresses

References

External links
 – Kagawa Office 
 – Office Pilote 
 – Diamond Blog 

Japanese women singers
Actresses from Tokyo
1952 births
Living people